Diocese of Tavush ( T'avushi t'em), is one of the newest dioceses of the Armenian Apostolic Church covering the Tavush Province of Armenia. The diocesan headquarters are located in the town of Ijevan. The seat of the bishop is the Surp Nerses Cathedral of Ijevan which was consecrated in 1998.

The diocese was established in 2010, when it was separated from the Diocese of Gougark. The prelacy building is located on the Yerevanian Street in the town of Ijevan, on the left bank of Aghstev river.

Structure
The primate of the diocese is bishop Bagrat Galstanyan who is in service since June 2015. The diocese has 3 priests who serve the area serving the 31 acting places of worship within the Tavush Province.

The diocese has the following departments:
Administration
Christian education centre
Media
Youth centre
Social
Economy

Active churches
As of 2016, the diocese has 17 churches, 3 monasteries and 9 chapels acting under its jurisdiction.

Churches

Holy Mother of God Church, Voskepar, 7th century
Surp Sarkis Church, Noyemberyan, 1848
Saint George's Church, Lusadzor, 19th century
Holy Mother of God Church, Tavush, 1902
Surp Nerses Shnorhali Cathedral, Ijevan, 1997
Surp Sarkis Church, Voskepar, 1999
Saint Gayane Church, Voskevan, 2003
Holy Cross Church, Dilijan, 2010
Holy Mother of God Church, Movses, 2011
Surp Grigor Church, Barekamavan, 2011
Saint Anna Church, Noyemberyan, 2011
Holy Saviour's Church, Ijevan, 2012
Saint David Church, Khashtarak, 2013
Saint George's Church, Berkaber, 2013
Surp Hovhannes Church, Verin Karmiraghbyur, 2013
Surp Hovhannes Church, Koghb, 2014
Surp Grigor Church, Gandzakar, 2014
Surp Hovhannes Church, Berd, 2014
Saint Helena Church, Yenokavan

Monasteries
Haghartsin Monastery near Dilijan, 10-13th centuries
Makaravank Monastery near Achajur, 10-13th centuries
Goshavank Monastery near Gosh, 12-13th centuries

Chapels
Holy Mother of God Chapel, Ijevan, 1998
Surp Hovhannes Chapel, Ijevan, 2002
Holy Mother of God Chapel, Sarigyugh, 2004
Saint Anna Chapel, Bagratashen, 2004
Holy Cross Chapel, Sevkar, 2005
Saint Vartan Chapel, Aknaghbyur, 2007
Surp Hovhannes Chapel, Ayrum, 2009
Holy Mother of God Chapel, Nerkin Tsaghkavan, 2010
Holy Mother of God Chapel, Kirants, 2010

Inactive/ruined churches and monasteries
This is an incomplete list of inactive or ruined churches and monasteries in the territory regulated by the Diocese of Tavush:

Tsrviz Chapel near Lusahovit, 5th century
Holy Mother of God Church, Voskepar, 7th century
Surp Hovhannes Church (Srbanes) near Yenokavan, 7th century
Kirants Monastery near Kirants, 8th century
Jukhtak Vank Monastery, near Dilijan, 11-12th centuries
Samsonavank Monastery near Kirants, 12-13th centuries
Skhmurad Monastery near Verin Tsaghkavan, 12-13th centuries
Aghavnavank Monastery near Aghavnavank, 12-13th centuries
Mshkavank Monastery near Koghb, 12-13th centuries
Surp Sarkis Chapel near Yenokavan, 12-13th centuries
Nor Varagavank Monastery near Varagavan, 12-14th centuries
Matosavank Monastery near Dilijan, 1247
Khachbazar Monastery near Gandzakar, 1286
Arakelots Monastery near Kirants, 13th century
Khoranashat Monastery near Chinari, 13th century
Srvegh Monastery near Aygehovit, 13th century
Kaptavank Monastery near Chinchin, 13th century
Khndzorut Church near Artsvaberd, 13th century
Deghdznut Monastery near Acharkut, 13th century
Mother Mary's Surp Nshan Church, Navur, 1286
Okonakhach Church near Yenokavan, 1863
Holy Mother of God Church, Achajur, 1900s

Primates
Archimandrite Torgom Tonikyan (as vicar, 10 December 2010 - 20 May 2012)
Archbishop Yeznik Petrosyan (20 May 2012 - 20 June 2015)
Bishop Bagrat Galstanyan (20 June 2015 - )

References
 

Tavush
Christianity in Armenia
Tavush Province
Oriental Orthodox dioceses in Armenia